The Germany cricket team toured Spain in March 2020 to play two Twenty20 International (T20I) matches. The matches were played on Sunday 8 March 2020 at the Desert Springs Cricket Ground in southern Spain. The series was drawn 1–1.

Squads

Faran Afzal withdrew from the Spain squad before the start of the series.

T20I series

1st T20I

2nd T20I

References

External links
 Series home at ESPN Cricinfo

2020 in Spanish cricket
2020 in German cricket

Associate international cricket competitions in 2019–20